The Lava is a coastal stream in the west of the department of Corse-du-Sud, Corsica, France.

Course

It flows through the commune of Appietto.
It rises to the west of the  Punta Pastinaca and flows west past the village of Appietto to Portu Provenzale.
When it reaches the sea the Lava turns to the north and flows behind the beach for a short distance before turning to the sea.
In winter, the Lava flows into the sea.
In summer it can cut through the beach during heavy rains.
The Köppen climate classification is Csb : Warm-summer Mediterranean climate.

Natura 2000 site

The Golfe de Lava is classified as a Natura 2000 site covering  between the Punta Pelusella, a rocky hill, to the north and a low sandy terrace to the south beside the Lava stream.
The site is under high pressure from tourists with motorized vehicles in the summer.
Footbridges and boardwalks have been installed to let the public access the beach all year without disturbing the flow of the stream, the plants and wildlife.
Flora include toadflax (Linaria flava), cottonrose (Filago tyrrhenica), Brompton stock (Matthiola incana) and tamarix.
Fauna include European pond turtle (Emys orbicularis), osprey (Pandion haliaetus), European leaf-toed gecko (Euleptes europaea) and Hermann's tortoise (Testudo hermanni).

Part of the site, the Dune du Golfe de Lava, has been designated a Zone naturelle d'intérêt écologique, faunistique et floristique (ZNIEFF).
It consists of a secondary coastal dune and the thicket of coastal mastic located behind the beach.
The dune holds sparse vegetation characteristic of this type of environment in the Mediterranean.
The three-horned stock (Matthiola tricuspidata) and Linaria flava subsp. sardoa are protected in France.

Tributaries

The following streams (ruisseaux) are tributaries of the Lava (ordered by length) and sub-tributaries:

Loriaggiu: 
San Gavinu: 
Grugnellu: 
Muchiesi: 
l'Albetronu: 
Cavucellu: 
Verginaccia: 
Monte Rossu: 
Forcalu: 
San Silvestro: 
Ficarella: 
Vita: 
la Scopa: 
Pedone: 
Petra Bianca: 
Sant'Andrea:

Notes

Sources

Rivers of Corse-du-Sud
Rivers of France
Coastal basins of the Mediterranean Sea in Corsica